Thorictodes is a genus of beetles in the family Dermestidae, the skin beetles.

There are five species.

Species include:

 Thorictodes bennetti John, 1961
 Thorictodes brevipennis Zhang & Liu in Liu & Zhang, 1986
 Thorictodes dartevellei John, 1961
 Thorictodes erraticus Champion, 1922
 Thorictodes heydeni Reitter, 1875

References

Dermestidae